Marcel Rohner (sometimes shown as Marcel Röhner; born 21 June 1964, in Baar, Switzerland) is a Swiss bobsledder who competed in the 1990s. At the 1998 Winter Olympics in Nagano, he won a silver medal in the four-man event with teammates Markus Nüssli, Markus Wasser and Beat Seitz.

Rohner also won two silver medals in the four-man event at the FIBT World Championships, earning them in 1996 and 1999.

In Bobsleigh World Cup, he won the four-man event both in 1996-97 and in 1999-2000, and the combined men's event in 1999-2000.

References
Bobsleigh four-man Olympic medalists for 1924, 1932-56, and since 1964
Bobsleigh four-man world championship medalists since 1930
DatabaseOlympics.com profile
List of combined men's bobsleigh World Cup champions: 1985-2007
List of four-man bobsleigh World Cup champions since 1985
List of two-man bobsleigh World Cup champions since 1985

1964 births
Bobsledders at the 1998 Winter Olympics
Living people
Medalists at the 1998 Winter Olympics
Olympic bobsledders of Switzerland
Olympic medalists in bobsleigh
Olympic silver medalists for Switzerland
People from Baar, Switzerland
Sportspeople from the canton of Zug
Swiss male bobsledders